Halat al Bahrani is a small island near Abu Dhabi.

References

Islands of the Emirate of Abu Dhabi
Central Region, Abu Dhabi